German submarine U-271 was a Type VIIC U-boat of Nazi Germany's Kriegsmarine during World War II. The submarine was laid down on 21 October 1941 at the Bremer Vulkan yard at Bremen-Vegesack as yard number 36, launched on 29 July 1942 and commissioned on 23 September under the command of Kapitänleutnant Curt Barleben. After training with the 8th U-boat Flotilla, U-271 was transferred to the 1st U-boat Flotilla, for front-line service from 1 June 1943.

U-271 sank no ships in her short career. She was a member of two wolfpacks.

Design
German Type VIIC submarines were preceded by the shorter Type VIIB submarines. U-271 had a displacement of  when at the surface and  while submerged. She had two shafts and two  propellers.

U-271 was fitted with five  torpedo tubes (four fitted at the bow and one at the stern), fourteen torpedoes, one  SK C/35 naval gun, 220 rounds, and two twin  C/30 anti-aircraft guns. The boat had a complement of between forty-four and sixty.

Service history

First patrol
The boat's initial foray started and finished in Lorient in occupied France. It was relatively uneventful.

Second patrol
It was a different story on her second patrol. One man died.

She was also attacked by a B-24 Liberator on 24 June south southeast of Cape Finisterre. The aircraft was shot down. The submarine sustained some damage.

Third patrol and loss
U-271 set off from Brest for the last time on 12 January 1944. On the 28th she was attacked and sunk west of Limerick in Ireland by a US Navy PB4Y-1 Liberator of VB-103.

Fifty-one men died; there were no survivors.

Wolfpacks
U-271 took part in two wolfpacks, namely:
 Rügen (21 – 26 January 1944) 
 Hinein (26 – 28 January 1944)

References

Bibliography

External links

German Type VIIC submarines
U-boats commissioned in 1942
U-boats sunk in 1944
World War II submarines of Germany
World War II shipwrecks in the Atlantic Ocean
1942 ships
Ships built in Bremen (state)
U-boats sunk by US aircraft
U-boats sunk by depth charges
Ships lost with all hands
Maritime incidents in January 1944